OSCAR I (aka OSCAR 1) is the first amateur radio satellite launched by Project OSCAR into low Earth orbit. OSCAR I was launched December 12, 1961, by a Thor-DM21 Agena B launcher from Vandenberg Air Force Base, Lompoc, California.  The satellite, a rectangular box (30 x 25 x 12 cm) weighing 10 kg., was launched as a secondary payload (ballast) for Corona 9029, also known as Discoverer 36, the eighth and final launch of a KH-3 satellite.

The satellite had a battery-powered 140 mW transmitter operating in the 2-meter band (144.983 MHz), employed a monopole transmitting antenna 60 cm long extended from the center of the convex surface, but had no attitude control system. 
Like Sputnik 1, Oscar 1 carried only a simple beacon. For three weeks it transmitted its Morse Code message "HI". To this day, many organizations identify their Morse-transmitting satellites with "HI", which also indicates laughter in amateur telegraphy.

OSCAR I lasted 22 days ceasing operation on January 3, 1962, and re-entered January 31, 1962.

After the launch of OSCAR-1, United States Vice President Lyndon B. Johnson, honored it with a telegram that read: "For me this project is symbolic of the type of freedom for which this country stands — freedom of enterprise and freedom of participation on the part of individuals throughout the world."

The original backup of OSCAR-1 has been restored and is fully operational, running off AC power. As of 2011 it is on display at ARRL HQ in Newington, Connecticut and continues to broadcast "HI" in Morse Code at 145 MHz.

Project OSCAR
Project OSCAR Inc. started in 1960 with the radio amateurs from the TRW Radio Club of Redondo Beach, California, many who worked at TRW, California defense industries, and Foothill College to investigate the possibility of putting an amateur satellite in orbit. Mr. Projoscar of Foothill College served as the Project Manager for Project OSCAR.  Project OSCAR was responsible for the construction of the first Amateur Radio Satellite OSCAR-1, that was successfully launched from Vandenberg AFB in California. OSCAR-1 orbited the earth for 22 days, transmitting the “HI” greeting. Project Oscar was responsible for launching the next 3 amateur radio satellites during the 1960s: OSCAR 2, OSCAR 3, and OSCAR 4.

Since that beginning, the group has focused on supporting and promoting amateur radio satellite related projects. Some current members take part in university satellite programs as advisors. The Project Oscar club has become more active since the start of the AMSAT Eagle project, with a renewed effort to build hardware and educate hams on the advantages of satellite operation.

In 1969 The Radio Amateur Satellite Organization (AMSAT) was founded by radio amateurs working at NASA's Goddard Space Flight Center and living in the Baltimore-Washington DC region, to continue the efforts begun by Project OSCAR. Its first project was to coordinate the launch of Australis-OSCAR 5, constructed by students at the University of Melbourne.

Today, more than fifty years later, Project OSCAR's mission is “To initiate and support activities that promote the Satellite Amateur Radio Hobby”. Project Oscar's primary goal is to reach out and provide logistical support, training and in some cases equipment to amateur radio associations, schools and the public at large.

See also

 OSCAR
 OSCAR 2

References

External links
 OSCAR 1 : Launched 50 Years Ago
 Project OSCAR

Amateur radio satellites
Satellites orbiting Earth
Secondary payloads
Spacecraft launched in 1961